Marko Car may refer to:

 Marko Car (writer), Serbian writer from the Bay of Kotor
 Marko Car (basketball), Croatian basketball player